St. Peter's Square is a historic Catholic complex and national historic district located at Fort Wayne, Indiana. The district encompasses five contributing buildings associated with St. Peter's Catholic Church. They are the Gothic Revival style St. Peter's Catholic Church (1892), former St. Peter's School (1904, 1914–1915), boiler house (1905-1915), and the Colonial Revival style John Suelzer House (1911) and garage (1920s).  The house serves as the church rectory.

It was listed on the National Register of Historic Places in 1991.

References

Churches on the National Register of Historic Places in Indiana
Historic districts on the National Register of Historic Places in Indiana
Colonial Revival architecture in Indiana
Gothic Revival church buildings in Indiana
Roman Catholic churches in Fort Wayne, Indiana
National Register of Historic Places in Fort Wayne, Indiana